The Upper Mississippi River is the portion of the Mississippi River upstream of St. Louis, Missouri, United States, at the confluence of its main tributary, the Missouri River.

History
In terms of geologic and hydrographic history, the Upper Mississippi east and south of  Fort Snelling is a portion of the now-extinct Glacial River Warren which carved the valley of the Minnesota River, permitting the immense Glacial Lake Agassiz to join the world's oceans at the Gulf of Mexico. The collapse of ice dams holding back Glacial Lake Duluth and Glacial Lake Grantsburg carved out the Dalles of the St. Croix River at Interstate Park. The Upper Mississippi River valley likely originated as an ice-marginal stream during the Pre-Illinoian Stage.

The Driftless Area is a portion of North America left unglaciated at that ice age's height, hence not smoothed out or covered over by previous geological processes.

Inasmuch as the Wisconsin glaciation formed lobes that met (and blocked) where the Mississippi now flows, and given that huge amounts of glacial meltwater were flowing into the Driftless Area, and that there is no lakebed, it is assumed that there were instances of ice dams bursting.

Characteristics

The Upper Mississippi from below St. Anthony Falls (Minneapolis, Minnesota) downstream to St. Paul, Minnesota is a gorge with high limestone bluffs carved by the waterfall. Upstream of the waterfall the land slopes gently to rivers edge. Downstream of downtown St. Paul the river enters its wide preglacial valley. The states of Minnesota, Wisconsin and Iowa, along with the federal government, have preserved certain areas of the land along this reach of the river.

There are three National Park Service sites along the Upper Mississippi River. The Mississippi National River and Recreation Area is the National Park Service site dedicated to protecting and interpreting the Mississippi River itself. The other two National Park Service sites along the river are: Effigy Mounds National Monument and the Gateway Arch National Park (home to the Gateway Arch in St. Louis).

Unlike the Lower Mississippi, much of the upper river is a series of pools created by a system of 29 locks and dams.  The structures were authorized by Congress in the 1930s, and most were completed by 1940.  A primary reason for damming the river is to facilitate barge transportation.  The dams regulate water levels for the Upper River and play a major part in regulating levels on the Lower Mississippi.

Ecology

On the upper reaches near the Minnesota-Wisconsin border, the river's floodplain is between 1.5 and 5 kilometers (between 1 and 3 mi) wide.  South of St. Louis, Missouri, the alluvial floodplain is approximately 80 kilometers (50 mi) wide.  Major tributaries to the Upper Mississippi River include the Missouri, Illinois, Minnesota, St. Croix, Chippewa, Black, Wisconsin, and Kaskaskia Rivers.

The Upper Mississippi provides habitat for more than 125 fish species and 30 species of freshwater mussels.  Three national wildlife refuges along the river cover a total of 465 square kilometers (285,000 ac).  The largest of them, the Upper Mississippi River National Wildlife and Fish Refuge, is over 420 kilometers (260 mi) long, reaching from the Alma, Wisconsin area down to Rock Island, Illinois. The refuge consists of blufflands, marshes, bottomland forest, islands, channels, backwater lakes and sloughs. It is part of the Mississippi Flyway.

Although the river is much cleaner than it was in recent decades, water quality is still a priority concern. Agricultural runoff, including sediment, excessive nutrients, (particularly nitrogen and phosphorus), and chemicals from agricultural and industrial sources continue to threaten Upper Mississippi River aquatic resources. In addition new threats continue to emerge such as personal care items including pharmaceuticals and endocrine-disrupting chemicals. The five states bordering the Upper Mississippi River are working together to address water quality issues.

There is general agreement that nutrients are contributing to the Gulf of Mexico dead zone and to eutrophication problems in Lake Pepin, a large natural riverine lake that is part of Pool 4 of the Upper Mississippi River. National and regional efforts are addressing these problems, but nutrient impairment problems are occurring elsewhere in the Upper Mississippi River as well, particularly in off-channel portions. Excessive nutrients contribute to thick floating mats of filamentous algae or duckweeds that have a pronounced negative impact on light penetration and may threaten the growth and persistence of submerged aquatic vegetation that is important for fish and aquatic life, including waterfowl. Efforts to control nutrients from point and non-point sources in the basin will provide additional benefits.

Navigation

Navigation locks allow towboats, barges, and other vessels to transit the dams.  Approximately 1350 kilometers (850 mi), from the head of navigation in Mile 858, Minneapolis, Minnesota down to Cairo, has been made suitable for commercial navigation with a depth of 2.75 meters (9 ft).  The agriculture and barge transportation industries have lobbied in the late 20th and early 21st centuries for a multibillion-dollar project to upgrade the aging lock and dam system.  Some environmental groups and advocates of budgetary restraint argue that the project lacks economic justification.

Each lock and dam complex creates a pool upstream of it.  There are 29 locks on the Upper Mississippi maintained by the U.S. Army Corps of Engineers—from Upper St. Anthony Falls upstream to Chain of Rocks downstream.
The locks provide a collective 123 meters (404 ft) of lift.

Expansion proposals for locks

The Army Corps of Engineers has studied expanding locks 20, 21, 22, 24, and 25 on the Upper Mississippi.

List of pools and locks

See also
List of crossings of the Upper Mississippi River
List of locks and dams of the Upper Mississippi River

References

External links
 Upper Mississippi Valley Digital Image Archive, a collection of images of the Mississippi Valley along the Iowa/Illinois border, from the 1860s through the 1950s. Images are from regional library special collections.

Upper